Flabelligeridae is a family of polychaete worms, known as bristle-cage worms, notable for their cephalic cage: long slender chaetae forming a fan-like arrangement surrounding the eversible (able to be turned inside-out) head. Unlike many polychaetes, they also have large, pigmented, complex eyes.

Habitat 
These worms live under stones and are known to burrow into sand. They have a cosmopolitan distribution and live in a variety of marine habitats, from the deep sea to shallow coastal regions.

Subdivisions 
The first species was Amphridite plumosa, described from Norway. Flabelligerids were placed in various similar polychaete families until Saint-Joseph erected the family (under the name Flabelligeriens) in 1894.

Mazopherusa is a possible fossil example from the Carboniferous; other fossil material is only dubiously assigned to the family.

References

Terebellida